Hard Time may refer to:

 Hard Time (comics), comic book series written by Steve Gerber and Mary Skrenes and originally published by DC Focus
 "Hard Time" (Star Trek: Deep Space Nine), a television episode
 "Hard Time", a song by Ratt from Detonator
 "Hard Time", a song by Status Quo from Rockin' All Over the World (album)
 Hard Time (film), a 1998 American crime film
Hard Time, a 2007 video game created by Mat Dickie
 Hard Time (2009 TV Series), a National Geographic documentary series

See also

 Hard Times (disambiguation)